The kamikaze were two winds or storms that are said to have saved Japan from two Mongol fleets under Kublai Khan. These fleets attacked Japan in 1274 and again in 1281. Due to the growth of Zen Buddhism among Samurai at the time, these were the first events where the typhoons were described as "divine wind" as much by their timing as by their force. Since Man'yōshū, the word kamikaze has been used as a Makurakotoba of waka introducing Ise Grand Shrine.

History
The latter fleet, composed of "more than four thousand ships bearing nearly 140,000 men", is said to have been the largest attempted naval invasion in history whose scale was only recently eclipsed in modern times by the D-Day invasion of allied forces into Normandy in 1944.  The size of the fleet is often disputed by modern historians, however.

Events
In the first invasion, the Mongols successfully conquered the Japanese settlements on Tsushima and Iki islands. When they landed on Hakata Bay, however, they met fierce resistance by the armies of samurai clans and were forced to withdraw to their bases in China. In the midst of the withdrawal, they were hit by a typhoon. Most of their ships sank and many soldiers drowned.

The first incident took place in autumn 1274 when a Mongol fleet of 500 to 900 ships carrying 30,000 to 40,000 men attacked Japan. While in Hakata Bay, Kyushu, a typhoon hit the fleet. An estimated 13,000 men drowned, around one-third of the ships sank, and the rest were damaged.

During the time period between the first and second invasion, the Japanese prudently built two-meter-high walls to protect themselves from future assaults.

Seven years later, the Mongols returned. Unable to find any suitable landing beaches due to the walls, the fleet stayed afloat for months and depleted their supplies as they searched for an area to land. After months of being exposed to the elements, the fleet was destroyed by a great typhoon, which the Japanese called "kamikaze" (divine wind). The Mongols never attacked Japan again, and more than 70,000 men were said to have been captured.

The second fleet was larger, comprising two forces with an estimated total of 4,400 ships and 140,000 men, greatly outnumbering the Japanese soldiers, who had an estimated 40,000 samurai and other fighting men. The typhoon led to the death of at least half the men, and only a few hundred vessels survived. Following the storm, most survivors were killed by the Japanese. This event is considered "one of the largest and most disastrous attempts at a naval invasion in history."

In myth
In popular Japanese myths at the time, the god Raijin was the god who turned the storms against the Mongols. Other variations say that the gods Fūjin, Ryūjin or Hachiman caused the destructive kamikaze.

As a metaphor
The name given to the storm, kamikaze, was later used during World War II as nationalist propaganda for suicide attacks by Japanese pilots. The metaphor meant that the pilots were to be the "Divine Wind" that would again sweep the enemy from the seas. This use of kamikaze has come to be the common meaning of the word in English.

See also
Act of God
Battle of Bun'ei
Battle of Kōan
Divine providence
Mongol invasions of Japan
Protestant Wind
Boreas
Miracle of the House of Brandenburg
Theodicy
Tornado

Notes

References

External links
Japan's Kamikaze Winds, the Stuff of Legend, May Have Been Real
Typhoons
Pre-1940 Pacific typhoon seasons
Unknown-strength tropical cyclones
Typhoons in Japan
13th century in Japan
1270s in Japan
1274 in Asia
1280s in Japan
1281 in Asia
Military history of the Mongol Empire
13th-century natural disasters
13th-century meteorology